This is a list of notable students and faculty members associated with the Taras Shevchenko National University of Kyiv. Faculty members, scholars and scientists of Kyiv University have made a worthy contribution to the development of science, art and social-political thinking in Ukraine and abroad.

Historians and philologists
Volodymyr Antonovych
O. Beletskiy
Mykhailo Drahomanov
Maryna Hrymych
Mykola Kostomarov
Ahatanhel Krymsky
I. Luchytskiy
Mykhaylo Maksymovych
Lyudmila Pavlichenko
V. Perets
Yevgeny Tarle

Journalists 
Valentyn Volodymyrovych Bugrym
Hanna Homonai
Andriy Shevchenko
Roman Skrypin

Lawyers
O.A. Dzyubenko
M. Ivanishev
Abdul G. Koroma
O. Kystyakovskiy
Andriy Livytskyi
K. Nevolin
Vasily Nezabitovsky
O.A. Shalimov
M. Vladimirskiy-Budanov
Mark Warshawsky

Economists
O.A. Dziubenko
Igor Vladimirovich Litovchenko
O.A. Shalimov
Igor Yegorov
M. Ziber

Mathematicians
M. Bogolyubov
Boris Yakovlevich Bukreev
Boris Delaunay
I. Gikhman
D. Grave
L. Kaluznin
Mikhail Kravchuk
Nikolay Mitrofanovich Krylov
Y. Petunin
Naum Z. Shor
Anatoliy Skorokhod
Mykhailo Vaschenko-Zakharchenko
Myhailo Yadrenko
V. Yermakov

Architects
Alexander Yusuf

Specialists in mechanics
I. Rakhmaninov
H. Suslov
P. Voronets

Physicists
 M. Avenarius
 Nikolay Bogolyubov
 Y. I. Kosonogov
 Vadim Lashkaryov
 Naum Davydovich Morgulis
 Solomon Isaakovich Pekar
 Emmanuel Rashba
 Nicolas Rashevsky
 M. Shiller
 Kirill Borisovich Tolpygo
 Yuri G. Zdesenko

Chemists
A. Babko
A. Holub
A. Kipriakov
Sergei Nikolaevich Reformatskii
V. Skopenko

Geologists
M. Andrusov
V. Chirvinskiy
K. Feofilaktov
P. Tutkovskiy

Botanists
 Aleksandr Vasiljevich Fomin (1869-1953)

Zoologists
Karl Kessler
O. Korotnev
O. Kovalevskiy
O. Severtsov

Medicine
Fedor Bogatyrchuk

Literature
Yusif Vazirov (Chamanzaminli) (1887–1943), Azerbaijani, graduated in 1916; author of novel Ali and Nino (1937) published under the pseudonym of Kurban Said
Viktor Petrov (1894–1969), existentialist writer
Maksym Rylsky (1895–1964), poet
Mykhailo Starytskiy (1840–1904), writer
Oksana Zabuzhko (born 1960), poet

Music
Mykola Lysenko

Politicians and activists
Olga Bodnar
Volodymyr Chemerys
Büdragchaagiin Dash-Yondon, Mongolia
Grigory Gershuni
Vitali Klitschko
Vyacheslav Kyrylenko
Yulia Marushevska, narrator of the 2014 video I Am a Ukrainian
Amina Mohamed
Yuriy Pavlenko
Rufet Quliyev, Member of Parliament of Azerbaijan

Kyiv University
 
Taras Shev